The 1913 Virginia Orange and Blue football team represented the University of Virginia as a member of the South Atlantic Intercollegiate Athletic Association (SAIAA) during the 1913 college football season. Led by first-year head coach W. Rice Warren, the Orange and Blue compiled an overall record of 7–1 with a mark of 1–1 in conference play, tying for third place in the SAIAA.

Schedule

References

Virginia
Virginia Cavaliers football seasons
Virginia Orange and Blue football